

SKIP (Supporting Kids in Peru)
SKIP is a UK founded NGO that has been active since 2003. The organization works in the city of Trujillo which is located on the north coast of Peru. Most of the work that the organization carries out is done in El Porvenir, an impoverished district of Trujillo. SKIP states that their vision is “A Peru where each child realizes his/her full potential through quality education, economically stable families and healthy home environments.” The organization promotes quality education and fosters the capacity of children and families to be the principal agents of change in their own lives. The organization works with families through programs focusing on the educational, economic, emotional and social development of each child and the parents. In 2016 the annual income for SKIP was 118,266 British pounds.

SKIP closed in 2019. From their website :-A Message From Supporting Kids in Peru
Dear friends,

After 15 years of providing services in the community of El Porvenir, SKIP has decided to close its doors. This January as a result of a joint decision by the Director and Board of Directors, SKIP closed its programmes with immediate effect. This decision was not taken lightly and the entire SKIP team and staff are saddened by the news.

There are a few reasons which have led to this outcome which combine security and financial issues as well as major staff changes which the parents found difficult to accept.

We would like to take this opportunity to thank everyone who has been involved in SKIP over the last 15 years. Please do not doubt the impact that we had in the community and the positive contribution we made to the SKIP families and children. Your efforts will not be forgotten and we hope that the families of SKIP will find the support we provided from different organisations in the area.

Everyone should be proud of the bonds made and lives changed over our 15 year history.

Un abrazo,

SKIP

SKIP’s Methodology
SKIP is made up of a team of volunteers from all over the world who work in departments focusing on education and on family welfare. SKIP believes in the global community's responsibility to promote universal quality education and eradicate poverty. SKIP's international volunteer program forges links between El Porvenir and other countries, providing opportunities for international volunteers to see and understand the effects of poverty, while at the same time opening 'windows to the world' for Peruvians and fostering a sense of community and responsibility among all.

According to the authors of the article “Strategies to avoid the loss of developmental potential in more than 200 million children in the developing world”, "The most effective early child development programs provide direct learning experiences to children and families, are targeted toward younger and disadvantaged children, are of longer duration, high quality, and high intensity, and are integrated with family support, health, nutrition, or educational systems and services." SKIP's educational and family support programs fit directly within this framework and SKIP's continually improving results can be attributed to the organization's commitment to working within this framework of a development program of long duration and high intensity.

Education Program
Children of low income families are a particularly vulnerable population in Peru. 27% of all school age children in Peru are not enrolled in school. Additionally, Peru spends only 3.3% of its GDP on education compared to the Latin American average of 4.5%. SKIP's education program aims to fill the gaps that exist in the public education system for students beginning at an early age. The World Bank recognizes that “One of the principal challenges in reducing poverty and accelerating development in Peru is improving the quality of education.”
SKIP understands the complex factors and consequences of poverty, and has therefore developed a range of programs employing a holistic approach. These focus on four pillars of family development: education, economic stability, emotional well-being, and healthy and safe home environments. SKIP has also worked towards the achievement of the 2nd and 3rd millennium goals proposed by the UN, that by 2015, children everywhere would be able to complete a full course of primary schooling, and to eliminate gender disparity in primary and secondary education in all levels of education no later than 2015.
SKIP places a high importance on participation of families and children in their programs and views high rates of participation as key to their holistic approach. Their rates of attendance increased from around 15 percent in 2008 to 83 percent in 2011.
SKIP's education program focuses on primary and secondary students and provides academic support in the form of Maths, Communication and English classes as well as workshops in other areas such as art and sport. There are about 300 students between the ages of four and eighteen currently enrolled in SKIP's education program. SKIP states that their approach involves a kinesthetic and dynamic teaching style to help relate concepts to their everyday lives, as well as a social and emotional learning program to help children have the skills and confidence to work through difficulties.

Family Welfare Programs
SKIP's focus on education is fostered by the holistic work within the welfare programs, which include the whole family unit. The parents are the ones ultimately responsible for the upbringing of the children, and so SKIP recognizes the importance of working with them in the areas of economic development, social work, and psychology. “Poverty and associated health, nutrition, and social factors prevent at least 200 million children in developing countries from attaining their developmental potential." SKIP's family welfare programs have the overarching goal of avoiding these risk factors that are directly related to poverty. The economic development team works with families in the form of microcredit loans and production workshops that serve as a form of secondary income for the families. In 2011, the microcredit program has seen a repayment rate of 99%. SKIP social workers provide workshops aimed at improving the social abilities of the parents and the psychology departments work with both children and parents in order to improve the families' emotional well-being.

References

External links
 

Trujillo, Peru